The Democratic Convergence Party (PCD) was a political party in Cape Verde.

History
The PCD was formed in 1994, following a split in the Movement for Democracy. In the 1995 parliamentary elections the party received 6.7% of the vote, winning a single seat in the 72-seat National Assembly.

In the buildup to the January 2001 parliamentary elections the party joined the Democratic Alliance for Change (ADM), a coalition including the Democratic and Independent Cape Verdean Union (UCID) and the Labour and Solidarity Party (PTS). The alliance received 6% of the vote, winning two seats in the National Assembly. In the presidential elections a month later, ADM candidate Jorge Carlos Fonseca finished third of the four candidates with 3% of the vote.

The alliance split prior to the 2006 parliamentary elections, which UCID and the PTS contested alone, while the PCD did not participate.

References

Political parties established in 1994
Defunct political parties in Cape Verde
1994 establishments in Cape Verde